The 2015 VTV Awards (Vietnamese: Ấn tượng VTV - Ấn tượng 2015) is a ceremony honouring the outstanding achievement in television on the Vietnam Television (VTV) network from August 2014 to July 2015. It took place on 6 September 2015 in Hanoi and hosted by Đinh Tiến Dũng, Thành Lộc & Minh Hà.

Winners and nominees
(Winners denoted in bold)

Presenters

Special performances

In Memoriam 
Celebrating 45 years since the first TV program was broadcast, the In Memoriam part tributes several important former leaders in VTV history.

Trần Lâm
Huỳnh Văn Tiếng
Lý Văn Sáu
Vũ Tá Duyệt
Nguyễn Văn Hán
Hoàng Tuấn
Chu Doanh

References

External links
List of television programmes broadcast by Vietnam Television (VTV)

2015 television awards
VTV Awards
2015 in Vietnamese television
September 2015 events in Vietnam